is  the Head coach of the Niigata Albirex BB in the Japanese B.League.

Head coaching record

|-
| style="text-align:left;"|Niigata Albirex BB
| style="text-align:left;"|2013-14
| 52||31||21|||| style="text-align:center;"|5th in Eastern|||5||2||3||
| style="text-align:center;"|Lost in 2nd round
|-
| style="text-align:left;"|Niigata Albirex BB
| style="text-align:left;"|2014-15
| 52||36||16|||| style="text-align:center;"|4th in Eastern|||5||3||2||
| style="text-align:center;"|Lost in 2nd round
|-
| style="text-align:left;"|Cyberdyne Tsukuba Robots
| style="text-align:left;"|2015-16
| 55||8||47|||| style="text-align:center;"|12th|||-||-||-||
| style="text-align:center;"|-
|-
| style="text-align:left;"|Gunma Crane Thunders
| style="text-align:left;"|2016-17
| 60||40||20|||| style="text-align:center;"|1st in B2 Eastern|||3||0||3||
| style="text-align:center;"|4th in B2
|-
| style="text-align:left;"|Gunma Crane Thunders
| style="text-align:left;"|2017-18
| 60||32||28|||| style="text-align:center;"|3rd in B2 Central|||-||-||-||
| style="text-align:center;"|-
|-
| style="text-align:left;"|Gunma Crane Thunders
| style="text-align:left;"|2018-19
| 60||43||17|||| style="text-align:center;"|1st in B2 Eastern|||5||2||3||
| style="text-align:center;"|Runners-up in B2
|-
| style="text-align:left;"|Gunma Crane Thunders
| style="text-align:left;"|2019-20
| 47||34||13|||| style="text-align:center;"|2nd in B2 Eastern|||-||-||-||
| style="text-align:center;"|-
|-

References

1974 births
Living people
Cyberdyne Ibaraki Robots coaches
Gunma Crane Thunders coaches
Japanese basketball coaches
Nihon University Red Sharks men's basketball players
Niigata Albirex BB coaches
Niigata Albirex BB players